David Alagna (born in Paris, 1975) is a French stage director and composer.

As a composer he is best known for his opera Le Dernier jour d'un condamné based on the story by Victor Hugo, to a libretto by his brother Frédérico Alagna, himself, and by his older brother Roberto Alagna.

References

1975 births
French male classical composers
French opera composers
Male opera composers
French opera directors
Living people
Musicians from Paris